This is a list of singles that charted in the top ten of the Billboard Hot 100 during 1998.

Mase scored four top ten hits during the year with "Feel So Good", "Been Around the World" / "It's All About the Benjamins", "What You Want", and "Lookin' at Me", the most among all other artists.

Top-ten singles

Key
 – indicates single's top 10 entry was also its Hot 100 debut
(#) – 1998 Year-end top 10 single position and rank (Despite not reaching the top 10 on the Billboard Hot 100 peaking at #11, I Don't Want to Wait by Paula Cole reached #10 on the Year-end Hot 100 single chart of 1998.)

1997 peaks

1999 peaks

See also
1998 in music
List of Billboard Hot 100 number-one singles of 1998
Billboard Year-End Hot 100 singles of 1998

References

General sources

Joel Whitburn Presents the Billboard Hot 100 Charts: The Nineties
Additional information obtained can be verified within Billboard's online archive services and print editions of the magazine.

1998
United States Hot 100 Top 10